Bess H. Marcus (born 1961) is an American clinical health psychologist and scholar of health behavior changes. She is currently Professor of Behavioral and Social Sciences at Brown University, having previously served as dean of the Brown University School of Public Health. Before coming to Brown, Marcus was the founder of the UC San Diego Institute for Public Health and inaugural Senior Associate Dean for Public Health, at the UC San Diego School of Medicine.

Marcus received a B.A. from Washington University in St. Louis in 1984. She completed her M.S. and Ph.D. in clinical psychology at Auburn University in 1986 and 1988.

In 2017, Bess Marcus became dean of the Brown University School of Public Health, succeeding inaugural dean Terrie Fox Wetle. Marcus was succeeded by Ashish Jha in 2020.

References

External links 

 

Washington University in St. Louis alumni
Auburn University alumni
Brown University faculty
University of California, San Diego faculty
American university and college faculty deans
Women deans (academic)
American women psychologists
20th-century psychologists
21st-century American psychologists
1961 births
Living people
American clinical psychologists